Wildest Organ in Town! is an album by Billy Preston. Released in 1966, it was arranged by Sly Stone.

The album peaked at No. 118 on the Billboard 200.

Critical reception
AllMusic wrote that Preston's "early prowess as a flashy organ equivalent of Jimi Hendrix has been largely forgotten or overlooked, and the fact that this album hasn't been in print for many years hasn't helped."

Track listing
 "Midnight Hour" (Wilson Pickett, Steve Cropper) - 2:11
 "Uptight" (Sylvia Moy, Stevie Wonder, Henry Cosby) - 2:22
 "A Hard Day's Night" (John Lennon, Paul McCartney) - 2:53
 "Ain't Got No Time to Play" (Billy Preston) - 2:02
 "Love (Makes Me Do Foolish Things)" (Holland-Dozier-Holland) - 2:29
 "The Duck" (Fred Smith, Earl Nelson) - 2:06
 "Advice" (Preston, Sly Stone) - 2:25
 "Satisfaction" (Mick Jagger, Keith Richards) - 2:40
 "I Got You" (James Brown) - 2:29
 "It's Got to Happen" (Preston, Stone) - 2:09
 "Free Funk" (Preston, Stone) - 2:40
 "The 'In' Crowd" (Billy Page) - 2:22

References

1966 albums
Billy Preston albums
Capitol Records albums